Dominion Rules (DR) is a role-playing game system for historical and fantasy role-playing. DR is notable in the history of role-playing games for being one of the first RPGs to be released under an open source (or open gaming) licence, known as the Dominion Rules Licence. Development of the game followed an open source model whereby contributors, known as the Dominion Games Development Team, made improvements or additions to the game and published them on the internet (often through the Dominion Games web site) under the terms of the Dominion Rules Licence, thus explicitly encouraging the creation of new skills, spells, beasts and rules by its modular structure in an attempt to establish an equivalent to the Open Source Software model in RPG gaming.

Game Mechanic
DR is a skills-based role-playing game system based on the twelve-sided die (d12). The game mechanic is the same for almost all actions: players roll d12 trying to roll less than or equal to the applicable skill stat, as modified by any applicable bonuses or penalties. For example, a character seeking to strike an opponent with his weapon begins with his Strike stat, adds to it the Strike bonus applicable to his weapon, and subtracts from that any defensive penalties imposed by his opponent's defensive manoeuvres and armour. A roll of 12 always fails. In many cases, a roll of 12 has particularly negative results. 

DR is designed around three major skill types, namely combat skills, priestcraft skills and witchcraft skills. All characters have access to combat skills. Priest-style characters have access to priest-specific skills such as bless, consecrate, curse, defile, heal, smite, wrath, and work miracle. Magic-using characters may either cast pre-made spells or employ free-form magic, both of which are essentially another type of skill use.

Game Setting
The DR rules system is intended to be generic and does not describe the kind of world (or "campaign setting") to which they apply. The system can be used in a variety of RPG settings by excluding or modifying certain rules. For a historical setting, players simply disregard the priestcraft and witchcraft rules.

Distribution
Dominion Rules was one of the first RPGs to be released under an open source style (or open gaming style) licence, known as the Dominion Rules Licence. The current version of DR  is distributed under version 2.0 of the Dominion Rules Licence. 

The current version of DR is free to download from Dominion Rules - Home. Copies of the previous versions can be found in various places on the internet.

History 
DR 1.0 appeared in 1999. It was revised and republished as version 2.0 in 2001. Both versions were distributed by Dominion Games. No retail, print versions of the game were published. DR 2.0 received some favourable reviews.

Dominion Games and their web site disappeared around 2006. The creators of the Dominion Rules released version 3.0 in April 2008 from  Dominion Rules - Home to favourable reviews.

References

Role-playing game systems
Open-source tabletop games